Kerry Remsen is an American actress. She is the daughter of actor Bert Remsen and casting director Barbara Joyce Dodd, sister of Ann Remsen Manners and has been married to Ron Cates since 2006. She attended the U.S. Grant High School in Van Nuys, California. She has appeared in well over twenty different films and television programs. She was a regular and prominent cast member of Leah Laiman's 1990s soap opera, Tribes. She is also most remembered by horror fans for her small part in A Nightmare on Elm Street 2: Freddy's Revenge, and supporting and co-starring roles in Pumpkinhead and Ghoulies II.

Background
Her mother, Barbara Joyce Dodd, was an actress and played Granny in Employee of the Month. Her actor father, Bert Remsen, died on April 22, 1999, aged 74. Her older sister is Ann Manners.

In addition to her more than 25-year career in film, she is the founder of ACT, Acting Communication Training, an organization that works to boost the morale and confidence of at-risk children in inner-city schools. Part of her work has been with the Payson Road organization to help children with eating disorders. In 2001, she was working with the organizations founder, Sarah Mason, who was an LA-based screenwriter at the time to organize the "Road to the Stars" event to raise support and awareness.  She is also a children's dance instructor and private acting coach.

Career

1980s
Remsen found a decent amount of work in the 1980s. She appeared in at least ten movies, with two of them made for television. Some of those films were the best known horror films of the decade. She also appeared in six different television programs. She had a part as a teenager in Jacqueline Susann's Valley of the Dolls, a 1981 TV movie which was directed by Walter Grauman. Then she had a credited role as Chris in Not My Kid, which was directed Michael Tuchner, and released in 1985. She then had a part as a stage manager in The Facts of Life, episode 3, 2, 1. She then had a major role as Samantha in the Jim Wilson directed 1986 film Smart Alec, which also starred Ben Glass, Antony Alda, Orson Bean and Natasha Kautsky. The next movie she appeared in was a made-for-television film. It was Dreams of Gold: The Mel Fisher Story, which was directed by James Goldstone and starred Cliff Robertson and Loretta Swit. Her role as Taffi Fisher, the youngest child of the treasure hunter Mel Fisher was a prominent one. In 1987, she appeared in 21 Jump Street, CBS Schoolbreak Special, and Our House. 
Her next film was Two Moon Junction, which was directed by Zalman King. She played the part of Carolee.

1990s
In 1990, she appeared on stage at the Friends Theatre in the play Montana, playing the part of Gayle.

Also in 1990 she landed a regular role as Pamela in Tribes. She appeared in the first episode which aired on the 5th of March that year. She appeared in a total of 65 of the show's 101 episodes, with her last airing on the 1st of June. Later that year she appeared as Trish in the Doogie Howser, M.D. episode, Car Wars.

In 1992, the comedy film Round Numbers was released. The cast included Kate Mulgrew, Samantha Eggar, Marty Ingels, and Rick Dano. Remsen's sister Anne Remsen Manners was involved in the casting. Rremsen played the part of Constance, and was credited as Kerry Remsen Phillips.

Horror films
The 1980s saw Remsen in some well known horror films.  She had a part in A Nightmare on Elm Street 2: Freddy's Revenge, which was  released in 1985. Another film released the same year was one she co-starred in. It was Ramsey Thomas's Appointment with Fear, in which she played the part of Heather. Her character Heather is the one that kills the villain Attis. She was a prominent cast member in the 1988 film Pumpkinhead which was directed by Stan Winston. She played the part of Maggie, the girlfriend of Joel Hoffman's character Steve. Also released that year was Ghoulies II, directed by Albert Band. In that film she had a prominent part playing the role of Nicole. As the leading female actress in the film, she teams up with Larry, played by Damon Martin. They join forces to find a way to send the creatures back to hell. Her last horror film for the decade which happened to be her last film for the decade was the Jim & Ken Wheat, directed / produced After Midnight. The film was in three parts with a different story in each. She played the part of Maggie in the "Allison's Story" segment.

Later years
As a coach, one of the actors she coached was Jason Ellefson, who went on to appear in Melrose Place, and 6 Guns. Other actors she worked with include Jennifer Holloway who had appeared as Barb in American Horror Story, and Jase Lindgren.

In Eric Shirey's review of Ghoulies and Ghoulies II on Scream Factory's blu-ray release, interviews of her along with producer Charles Band, and special effects artist Gino Crognale are noted as the bonus features for Ghoulies II.

Filmography

References

External links

Living people
People from Van Nuys, Los Angeles
Year of birth missing (living people)
Actresses from California
Dance teachers
American acting coaches
Grant High School (Los Angeles) alumni
21st-century American women